Bavia kairali is a possible species of jumping spider in the genus Bavia. It is endemic to India. , the species was not accepted by the World Spider Catalog.

Description
The cephalothorax of the male is black in colour and that of the female is brownish.

References

External links
Bavia kairali at LifeDesks: Spiders of India. Archived from the original.

Salticidae
Spiders of the Indian subcontinent
Spiders described in 2002